The Serf Actress is a 1963 Soviet musical film directed by Roman Tikhomirov.

Plot 
The film tells about the serf Nastya Batmanova, who was able to make a successful acting career in the court theater. She travels around the world, and when she returns, she finds herself in the Kutaysov's mansion among hussars and ladies, and there in her soul a feeling of love is born.

Cast 
 Tamara Syomina as Anastasiya Batmanova (voiced by Tamara Milashkina)
 Yevgeny Leonov as Count Ivan Pavlovich Kutaysov
 Dmitri Smirnov as Prince Andrei Tumansky
 Sergey Yursky as Prince Nikita Petrovich Baturin
 Grenada Mnatsakanova as Polenka
 Aleksandr Potapov as Mitka
 Sergey Filippov as Ruler of Yelpidifor
 Glikeriya Bogdanova-Chesnokova as Primadonna Glikeriya Orestovna Rykalova
 Marina Polbentseva as Avdotya Lytkina
 Aleksei Smirnov as singer

References

External links 
 

1963 films
1960s Russian-language films
Soviet musical films
1963 musical films
Lenfilm films
Soviet historical musical films
Films set in 1801
Films about musical theatre